Bruno Valdemar Åvik (born 14 November 1940) is a retired Swedish cross-country skier. He competed in the 30 km event at the 1968 Winter Olympics and finished in 20th place. Åvik was born in Finland, but in 1959 moved to Sweden and became a Swedish citizen in 1966.

Cross-country skiing results

Olympic Games

References

1940 births
Living people
Cross-country skiers at the 1968 Winter Olympics
Olympic cross-country skiers of Sweden
Swedish male cross-country skiers
Finnish emigrants to Sweden
Naturalized citizens of Sweden
Swedish people of Finnish descent